The .276 Pedersen (7×51mm) round was an experimental 7 mm cartridge developed for the United States Army. It was used in the Pedersen rifle and early versions of what would become the M1 Garand.

Summary
Developed in 1923 in the United States, it was intended to replace the .30-06 Springfield in new semi-automatic rifles and machine guns. When first recommended for adoption, M1 Garand rifles were chambered for the .276 Pedersen, which held ten rounds in its unique en-bloc clips. The .276 Pedersen was a shorter, lighter and lower pressure round than the .30-06, which made the design of an autoloading rifle easier than the long, powerful .30-06. The U.S. Army Chief of Staff Gen. Douglas MacArthur rejected the .276 Pedersen Garand in 1932 after verifying that a .30-06 version was feasible.

History and technical notes

Pedersen's round fired a 0.284-inch (7mm) bullet. Comparable to the contemporary Italian 6.5×52mm (0.268 in) Carcano or the Japanese 6.5mm (0.264 in) Arisaka, it produced velocities of around 2,400 feet per second (730 m/s) with 140 or 150 grain (9.1 or 9.7 g) projectiles. The case was two inches (51 mm) long with significant taper. Tapered cases simplify the extraction, but require the use of highly curved magazines similar to the Kalashnikov, although for the short magazines of the Pedersen and Garand rifles, this was immaterial. Both waxed and bare cartridges were made for the Pedersen and Garand rifle respectively. An armor-piercing T1 cartridge was developed and presumably a tracer.

At the time of its introduction, the .276 Pedersen was a solution to a significant problem.  The U.S. Army wanted a general issue autoloading rifle that would fire the .30-06 cartridge, but such a rifle was prohibitively large with existing designs such as the Browning Automatic Rifle and French Chauchat.  A weapon of the same weight as the M1903 needed to fire a smaller cartridge.  Pedersen's cartridge was viewed as a compromise as it was underpowered compared to most military rifle cartridges.  This decreased recoil energy made possible a reliable, lightweight semi-automatic rifle with existing technology. Despite overcoming these early semi-automatic problems, the Garand was chosen because it did not require the use of lubricated cartridge cases for reliable function.  The Garand was originally going to be chambered in the .276 Pedersen, but the logistics of changing all of the infantry's guns (including machine guns) to a new round was judged cost-prohibitive, so the Garand was chambered in .30-06, removing the need for the new cartridge.

Immediately after World War II, British designers introduced a series of intermediate-power 7mm cartridges for a different reason than Pedersen.  They sought an answer to the Germans' highly successful 7.92mm Kurz and various studies on the matter. The U.S. stuck with .30 caliber mostly out of a desire to have a common cartridge between rifle and machine gun combined with the perceived necessity for effectiveness out to 2,000 yards. Development of a shorter .30 round specifically for use in an autoloading rifle began after the war, and resulted in the 7.62×51mm NATO, a shorter and slightly lighter round that gave nearly identical ballistics to the .30-06. The British studies on various cartridges culminated in the .280 British cartridge, which shared ballistic similarities to the .276 Pedersen in caliber, bullet weight and velocity.

Despite the failure to adopt either the .276 Pedersen or later .280 British, the concept of an intermediate power military cartridge of a 6.5 to 7mm diameter was far from dead. Shortly after the 7.62mm NATO cartridge was adopted, Armalite submitted their AR-10 for evaluation, the U.S. Army suggested they redesign the gun to fire a .256 caliber projectile. Although this suggestion was fruitless, the Army later engaged in many studies of a 6mm SAW cartridge. They, once again, sought to replace autoloading rifle and machine gun cartridges with one round. Nearly 100 years after the .276 Pederson introduced the concept of a 7mm infantry round, on April 19, 2022, the United States Army adopted the .277 Fury (6.8 x 51 Common) as the United States Army's general purpose cartridge, this cartridge features a 7.04 mm bullet in a necked down 7.62 x 51 NATO case. The adoption of this round reinforces the Army's 1923 conclusion about the superiority of 7mm-ballistics (then signified by the proposed adoption of the .276 Pedersen) compared to a 30 caliber round, and finally places ballistic performance in front of General Douglas MacArthur's cost-saving decision to scrap a 7mm bullet in favor of military surplus 30-06 ammunition left over from World War One as the primary cartridge to be used in the M-1 Garand during World War Two.  The new 7-mm .277 Fury round will be deployed both in an in infantry battle rifle as well as in a dedicated machine gun and exemplifies the versatility of the 7-mm bullet in both weapon systems.

See also
7 mm caliber

References

Hatcher's Book of the Garand. Julian S. Hatcher
Cartridges of the World. Frank C. Barnes.
Handloader's Manual of Cartridge Conversions. Donnelly + Townsend
Guns. Chris McNab
Book of Combat Arms 2005. Guns and Ammo Magazine
Various articles in The American Rifleman. RifleShooter and Guns and Ammo magazines.

External links
patent

Pistol and rifle cartridges
Experimental cartridges